Yaletown–Roundhouse is an underground station on the Canada Line of Metro Vancouver's SkyTrain rapid transit system.

History

Yaletown–Roundhouse station opened in 2009, and its name is derived from the neighbourhood in which it is located, as well as a historic railway roundhouse which now serves as a community centre. VIA Architecture was the architecture firm responsible for designing the station.

In 2018, TransLink announced that Yaletown–Roundhouse station, as well as two other Canada Line stations located in downtown Vancouver, would receive an accessibility upgrade which includes additional escalators. Construction began on January 28, 2019, and was completed by July.

Station information

Station layout

Entrances
Yaletown–Roundhouse station is served by a single entrance located at the northeast corner of the intersection at Davie Street and Mainland Street.

Transit connections

The following bus routes can be found in close proximity to Yaletown–Roundhouse station:

References

Canada Line stations
Railway stations in Canada opened in 2009
Buildings and structures in Vancouver
2009 establishments in British Columbia